William Thomas Reid (November 8, 1843–December 18, 1922) was an American educator who served as the Fourth President of the University of California from 1881 to 1885.

Early life
Reid was born on November 8, 1843 on a farm outside Jacksonville, Illinois. He entered Illinois College in 1859 but left in 1861 to join the Union Army. He served until the end of the war as a member of the 68th Illinois Infantry Regiment and later as the commander of the prison camp in Alexandria, Virginia. He graduated from Harvard College in 1868 and Harvard University in 1872. On August 16, 1870 he married Julia Reed in Jacksonville, Illinois.

Career
From 1868 to 1871, Reid was the headmaster of Newport High School in Newport, Rhode Island. He then served as first assistant to the headmaster of the Boston Latin School. From 1873 to 1875 he was the superintendent of schools in Brookline, Massachusetts.

In 1875, Reid moved to California, where he served as the headmaster of the Boys' High School in San Francisco. From 1881 to 1885, Reid was president of the University of California. Soon after Reid took office, written entrance examinations replaced oral tests and the scope of the examinations for literary and science courses were expanded. Examinations were in Los Angeles and Marysville, California so students could take the tests without having to travel all the way to Berkley, California. During Reid's tenure, the University hired noted professors George Herbert Palmer and Josiah Royce. In 1885, Reid founded the Belmont School in Belmont, California. In 1893 it merged with the Hopkins Academy to form the Belmont School, W. T. Reid Foundation. He retired in 1918.

Death
Reid died on December 18, 1922. He was survived by his son, Harvard football coach William Thomas Reid Jr.

References

1843 births
1922 deaths
Harvard University alumni
Leaders of the University of California, Berkeley
People from Jacksonville, Illinois
People from Berkeley, California
School superintendents in Massachusetts
Union Army soldiers
University of California regents